El Rosario is a municipality in the Carazo department of Nicaragua.

more info in https://web.archive.org/web/20080418080254/http://elrosariocarazo.com/

Municipalities of the Carazo Department